Ariel Miguel Santiago Ibagaza (born 27 October 1976) is an Argentine professional football manager and former player.
Nicknamed El Caño, his usual position was attacking midfielder, and he was well known for his technique and vision.

He spent the vast majority of his professional career in Spain – where he represented mainly Mallorca – and amassing La Liga totals of 343 matches and 33 goals over 12 seasons.

Playing career

Born in Buenos Aires, Ibagaza began his professional career with Club Atlético Lanús, and moved in July 1998 to RCD Mallorca in Spain alongside teammate Gustavo Siviero (another Argentine, Carlos Roa, had done the same move the previous season), being part of the Balearic Islands side that finished third in his first year, narrowly missing on UEFA Champions League group stage entry.

In the 2000–01 campaign Ibagaza, best known for his playmaking decisions, scored a career-best ten goals, and continued to be an undisputed starter – and team captain – for Mallorca until his departure for Atlético Madrid, in July 2003. He renewed his contract in March 2006, but found himself surplus to requirements at the start of 2006–07, and arranged a move back to Mallorca, being among the top assisters in the second season after the return.

Ibagaza signed a €1.5 million deal with Villarreal CF in early July 2008, for two seasons. Two years later, after two irregular seasons, marred by some physical problems (even though he still managed to appear in more than 60 official games with the Valencian team), the 34-year-old moved to Olympiacos F.C. in Greece, agreeing to a two-year deal.

Ibagaza scored his first official goal for the Piraeus club in a 1–0 away win against Asteras Tripoli FC, and went on to contribute with 24 matches (no goals) as his team won the national championship. He left in June 2014 after 97 competitive appearances and a further three domestic leagues and, on 20 August of that year, signed for one year with fellow league side Panionios FC.

Managerial career
Ibagaza managed Olympiacos B for season 2021–22 in Super League Greece 2.

Honours
Lanús
Copa CONMEBOL: 1996

Mallorca
Copa del Rey: 2002–03

Olympiacos
Super League Greece: 2010–11, 2011–12, 2012–13, 2013–14
Greek Football Cup: 2011–12, 2012–13

Argentina
FIFA U-20 World Cup: 1995

Individual
Super League Greece Player of the Year: 2010–11
Olympiacos Golden Eleven

References

External links

1976 births
Living people
Footballers from Buenos Aires
Argentine footballers
Association football midfielders
Argentine Primera División players
Club Atlético Lanús footballers
La Liga players
RCD Mallorca players
Atlético Madrid footballers
Villarreal CF players
Super League Greece players
Olympiacos F.C. players
Panionios F.C. players
Argentina youth international footballers
Argentina under-20 international footballers
Argentina international footballers
Argentine expatriate footballers
Expatriate footballers in Spain
Expatriate footballers in Greece
Argentine expatriate sportspeople in Spain
Argentine expatriate sportspeople in Greece